Dorogháza is a village in Nógrád County, Hungary with 1,266 inhabitants (2001).

Restaurants 

Mátrakocsma is a local bar in the village.

References

Populated places in Nógrád County